Anne White (born September 28, 1961) is an American former professional tennis player from Charleston, West Virginia. She is most famous for wearing a white body suit at Wimbledon in 1985.

Early life
White attended John Adams Junior High School. She then graduated from George Washington High School in Charleston, West Virginia, and went on to become a two-time All-American tennis player at the University of Southern California.

Family background
Anne's father, Pete White, played basketball for Clendenin High School.

1985 Wimbledon Championships
White, who was playing fifth seed Pam Shriver in the first round at Wimbledon in 1985 on an outer court, warmed up in a tracksuit. When she took the tracksuit off to start play, she revealed that she was wearing a white, one-piece, lycra body suit, which attracted a lot of attention from the crowd and the photographers. With the match tied at one set all, play was stopped for the day because of bad light, and the tournament referee, Alan Mills, told her to wear more appropriate clothing the next day. She did so, and lost the third set, but the incident was widely reported. She was later quoted as saying, "I had no idea it would be so controversial."

Results
White won her only singles title at Phoenix, Arizona, on March 9, 1987, beating the top seeded Dianne Balestrat in the final. She reached the semifinals of the women's doubles in the 1984 U.S. Open and in 1985 in the French Open.

Career earnings and prize money
White claims that her career earnings are more than a million dollars (possibly including endorsements and other monies). According to official WTA records, her career prize money is $411,022 ranking her at 605th all time as of 8/1/2016.

Career finals

Singles (1 title, 1 runner up)

Grand Slam singles tournament timeline

References

External links
 
 
 Sunday Times article 18 April, 2010

1961 births
American female tennis players
George Washington High School (Charleston, West Virginia) alumni
Living people
Sportspeople from Charleston, West Virginia
Tennis people from West Virginia
USC Trojans women's tennis players